Laurie Taylor (born 10 February 1996) is a British alpine skier. He competed in the PyeongChang 2018 Olympic Winter Games finishing 26th overall in the Men's Slalom and 5th in the Team Parallel narrowly missing out on an Olympic bronze medal.

References

1996 births
Living people
Alpine skiers at the 2018 Winter Olympics
British male alpine skiers
Olympic alpine skiers of Great Britain